The word Hanani ( Ḥănānî) means "God has gratified me" or "God is gracious".

Hanani is the name of four men mentioned in the Hebrew Bible:
 One of the sons of Heman (1 Chronicles 25:4, 25).
 A "seer" or prophet who was sent to rebuke king Asa of Judah for entering into a league with Ben-Hadad I, king of Syria, against the northern kingdom of Israel. 

Hanani was imprisoned in stocks by Asa (2 Chronicles 16:7-10). This Hanani was also probably the father of the prophet Jehu, who rebuked Baasha, king of the northern kingdom (1 Kings 16:1-4, 7) and Jehoshaphat , king of the southern kingdom (2 Chronicles 19:1-3). The Pulpit Commentary suggests both "belonged to the Kingdom of Judah". Hanani's criticism of Asa's treaty with Syria does not appear in the parallel narrative in 1 Kings 15. Hanani would appear to have had a group of supporters who shared his criticism or disapproved of his arrest, whose protests were also "crushed" by Asa.
A member of the priestly family of Immer, listed in Ezra 10:20 as having married a foreign wife.
 Probably a brother of Nehemiah (Nehemiah 1:2; 7:2), who reported to him the melancholy condition of Jerusalem. Nehemiah afterwards appointed him to have charge of the city gates.

References

External links
Hanani – WebBible Encyclopedia

10th-century BC people